The Chevrolet Corvette is a two-door, two-passenger luxury sports car manufactured and marketed by Chevrolet since 1953. With eight design generations, noted sequentially from C1 to C8, the Corvette is noted for its performance and distinctive fiberglass or composite panels. It was front-engined through 2019 and mid-engined since. 

The Corvette is currently the only two-seat sports car produced by a major United States auto manufacturer and it serves as Chevrolet's halo vehicle.

In 1953, GM executives accepted a suggestion by Myron Scott, then the assistant director of the Public Relations department, to name the company's new sports car after the corvette, a small maneuverable warship. The first model, a convertible, was introduced at the 1953 GM Motorama as a concept car; production models went on sale later that year. In 1963, the second generation was introduced in coupe and convertible styles. Originally manufactured in Flint, Michigan, and St. Louis, Missouri, the Corvette has been produced in Bowling Green, Kentucky, since 1981, which is also the location of the National Corvette Museum.

The Corvette has become widely known as "America's Sports Car." Automotive News wrote that after being featured in the early 1960s television show Route 66, "the Corvette became synonymous with freedom and adventure," ultimately becoming both "the most successful concept car in history and the most popular sports car in history."

History

First generation (C1; 1953–1962) 

The first generation of Corvette was introduced late in the 1953 model year. It first appeared as a show car for the 1953 General Motors Motorama, held January 17–23 at New York's Waldorf-Astoria Hotel. At the time, Chevrolet general manager Thomas H. Keating said it was six months to a year away from production readiness. The car generated enough interest to commence mass production on June 30, 1953.

Unique to Corvette was its hand laid-up fiberglass body. This generation was often referred to as the "solid-axle" models, with independent rear suspension appearing in the next. Three hundred hand-built Corvette convertibles were produced, all Polo White, for the 1953 model year.

The 1954 model year vehicles could be ordered in Pennant Blue, Sportsman Red, Black, or Polo White; 3,640 were built and sold slowly.

 
The 1955 model offered a  V8 engine as an option. Despite the poor sales of the Corvette at the time, the brand-new V-8 was an overwhelmingly popular option. Only 6 of the 1955 models were produced with the inline-six. With a large inventory of unsold 1954 models, GM limited production to 700 for 1955. With the new V8, the 0–60 mph time improved by 1.5 seconds, and saw three new competitors called the Ford Thunderbird and the Studebaker Speedster introduced that same year, and the larger Chrysler C-300.

A new body was introduced for the 1956 model featuring a new "face" and side coves; the taillamp fins were also gone. An optional "Ramjet" fuel injection system was made available in the middle of the 1957 model year. Other options included power windows (1956), hydraulic ally-assisted convertible top (1956), heavy-duty brakes and suspension (1957), and four-speed manual transmission (late 1957). Delco Radio transistorized signal-seeking "hybrid" car radio, which used both vacuum tubes and transistors in its radio's circuitry (1956 option).

The 1958 Corvette received a body and interior freshening which included a longer front end with quad headlamps, bumper exiting exhaust tips, a new steering wheel, and a dashboard with all gauges mounted directly in front of the driver. For 1958 only were 1958 hood louvers and twin trunk spears. The 1959–60 model years had few changes except a decreased amount of body chrome and more powerful engine offerings.

In 1961, the rear of the car was completely redesigned with the addition of a "duck tail" with four round lights. The light treatment would continue for all following model year Corvettes until 2014. For an extra 12% over list price, the fuel-injected version produced , making it the fastest of the C1 generation. 1962 was also the last year for the wraparound windshield, solid rear axle, and convertible-only body style. The trunk lid and exposed headlamps did not reappear for many decades.

Second generation (C2; 1963–1967) 

The second generation (C2) Corvette, which introduced Sting Ray to the model, continued with fiberglass body panels, and overall, was smaller than the first generation. The C2 was later referred to as mid-years. The car was designed by Larry Shinoda with major inspiration from a previous concept design called the "Q Corvette," which was created by Peter Brock and Chuck Pohlmann under the styling direction of Bill Mitchell. Earlier, Mitchell had sponsored a car known as the "Mitchell Sting Ray" in 1959 because Chevrolet no longer participated in factory racing. This vehicle had the largest effect on the styling of this generation, although it had no top and did not give away what the final version of the C2 would look like. The third inspiration was a mako shark Mitchell had caught while deep-sea fishing.

Production started for the 1963 model year and ended in 1967. Introducing a new name, "Sting Ray", the 1963 model was the first year for a Corvette coupé and it featured a distinctive tapering rear deck (a feature that later reappeared on the 1971 "Boattail" Buick Riviera) with, for 1963 only, a split rear window. The Sting Ray featured hidden headlamps, non-functional hood vents, and an independent rear suspension. Corvette chief engineer Zora Arkus-Duntov never liked the split rear window because it blocked rear vision, but Mitchell thought it to be a key part of the entire design. Options included electronic ignition, the breakerless magnetic pulse-triggered Delcotronic first offered on some 1963 Pontiac models. On 1964 models the decorative hood vents were eliminated and Duntov, the Corvette's chief engineer, got his way with the split rear window changed to a full-width window.

Four-wheel disc brakes were introduced in 1965, as was a "big block" engine option: the  V8. Side exhaust pipes were also optionally available in 1965, and continued to be offered through 1967. The introduction of the   big block in 1965 spelled the beginning of the end for the Rochester fuel injection system. The  option cost  while the fuel injected  engine cost . Few could justify spending  more for  less, even though FI could deliver over 20 mpg on the highway and would keep delivering fuel despite high G-loading in corners taken at racing speeds. Another 1963 and 1964 option was the Z06 competition package, which offered stiffer suspension, bigger, multi-segment lined brakes with finned drums, and more. Only a couple hundred coupes and a single convertible were factory-equipped this way in 1963. With only 771 fuel-injected cars built in 1965, Chevrolet discontinued the option at the end of the 1965 production, having introduced a less-expensive big block 396 engine rated at 425 hp in the middle of the production year and selling over 2,000 in just a few months. For 1966, Chevrolet introduced an even larger  Big Block version. Other options available on the C2 included the Wonderbar auto-tuning AM radio, AM-FM radio (mid-1963), air conditioning (late-1963), a telescopic steering wheel (1965), and headrests (1966). The Sting Ray's independent rear suspension was successfully adapted for the new-for-1965 Chevrolet Corvair, which solved the quirky handling problems of that unique rear-engine compact.

1967 was the final model year for the second generation. The 1967 model featured restyled fender vents, less ornamentation, and backup lamps - which were on the inboard in 1966 - were now rectangular and centrally located. The first use of all four taillights in red started in 1961 and was continued thru the C2 line-up except for 1966. This feature returned for the 1967 model year and then continued on all Corvettes since. Only twenty such engines were installed at the factory. From 1967 through 1969, the Holley triple two-barrel carburetor, or Tri-Power, was available on the 427 L89 (a $368 option, on top of the cost for the high-performance 427). Despite these changes, sales slipped more than 15%, to 22,940 (8,504 coupes, off close to 15%, and 14,436 convertibles, down nearly 19%).

Duntov came up with a lightweight version of the C2 in 1962. Concerned about Ford and what they were doing with the Shelby Cobra, GM planned to manufacture 100 Grand Sport Corvettes, but only five were actually built. They were driven by historic drivers such as Roger Penske, A. J. Foyt, Jim Hall, and Dick Guldstrand among others. Today the five cars (001-005) are all held by private owners, and are among the most coveted and valuable Corvettes ever built. 002 is exhibited in the Simeone Foundation Automotive Museum and is in running condition.

Third generation (C3; 1968–1982) 

The third-generation Corvette, patterned after the Mako Shark II concept car, was introduced for the 1968 model year and was in production until 1982. C3 coupes featured the first use of T-top removable roof panels. It introduced monikers that were later revived, such as LT-1, ZR-1, Z07, and Collector Edition. In 1978, Corvette's 25th anniversary was celebrated with a two-tone Silver Anniversary Edition and an Indy Pace Car replica edition of the C3. This was also the first time that a Corvette was used as a Pace Car for the Indianapolis 500.

Engines and chassis components were mostly carried over from the C2, but the body and interior were new.

There was an extended production run for the 1969 model year due to a lengthy labor strike, which meant sales were down on the 1970 models, to 17,316. 1970 small-block power peaked with the optional high compression, high-revving LT-1 that produced . The ZR-1 special package was an option available on the 1970 through 1972 model years, and included the LT-1 engine combined with special racing equipment. Only 53 ZR-1's were built.

In 1971, to accommodate regular low-lead fuel with lower anti-knock properties, the engine compression ratios were lowered which resulted in reduced power ratings. The power rating for the  L48 base engine decreased from 300 to 270 horsepower and the optional special high-performance LT1 engine decreased from 370 to 330 horsepower. The LS5  motor was carried over and produced . Offered in ‘71 only was the LS6  big-block featuring aluminum heads and delivering , the highest of the 1970-1972 series, and could be ordered with an automatic transmission. For the 1972 model year, GM moved to the SAE Net measurement which resulted in further reduced, but more realistic, power ratings than the previous SAE Gross standard. Although the 1972 model's  horsepower was actually the same as that for the 1971 model year, the lower net horsepower numbers were used instead of gross horsepower. Engine power decreased with the base ZQ3 engine producing , the optional L82's output , while the 454 big-block engine was discontinued. Gradual power increases after 1975 peaked in 1980 with the model's optional L82 producing  in its final year. 1981 saw a single engine, the L81, which had  while the fuel-injected 1982 L83 had .

Styling changed subtly throughout the generation until 1978 for the car's 25th anniversary. The Sting Ray nameplate was not used on the 1968 model, but Chevrolet still referred to the Corvette as a Sting Ray; however, 1969 (through 1976) models used the "Stingray" name as one word, without the space. In 1970, the body design was updated including fender flares, and interiors were refined, including redesigned seats and indication lights near the gear shift that were an early use of fiber optics. Because of government regulation, the 1973 Corvette's chrome front bumper was changed to a  system with a urethane bumper cover. 1973 Corvettes are unique in that sense, as they are the only year when the front bumper was polyurethane and the rear retained the chrome two-piece bumper set. 1973 was also the last year chrome bumpers were used. The optional wire-spoked wheel covers (left) were offered for the last time in 1973. Only 45 Z07 were built in 1973. From 1974 onwards both the front and rear bumpers were polyurethane.

In 1974, a  rear bumper system with a two-piece, tapering urethane bumper cover replaced the Kamm-tail and chrome bumper blades, and matched the new front design from the previous year. The 1975 model year ended the convertible body style until it returned 11 years later, and Dave McLellan succeeded Zora Arkus-Duntov as the Corvette's Chief Engineer. For the 1976 models the fiberglass floor was replaced with steel panels to provide protection from the catalytic converter's high operating temperature. For 15 model years the names Corvette, Sting Ray, and Stingray were synonymous. 1977 was the last year the tunneled roof treatment with a vertical back window was used, in addition, leather seats were available at no additional cost for the first time. The black exterior color returned after a six-year absence.

The 1978 25th Anniversary model introduced the fastback glass rear window and featured a new interior and dashboard. Corvette's 25th anniversary was celebrated with the Indy 500 Pace Car limited edition and a Silver Anniversary model featuring silver over gray lower body paint. All 1979 models featured the previous year's pace car seats and offered the front and rear spoilers as optional equipment. 53,807 were produced for the model year, making 1979 the peak production year for all versions of the Corvette. Sales have trended downward since then. In 1980, the Corvette received an integrated aerodynamic redesign that resulted in a significant reduction in drag. After several years of weight increases, 1980 Corvettes were lighter as engineers trimmed both body and chassis weight. In mid-1981, production relocated from St. Louis, to Bowling Green, Kentucky (where all subsequent Corvette generations have since been manufactured), and several two-tone paint options were offered. The 1981 models were the last available with a manual transmission until well into the 1984 production run. In 1982, a fuel-injected engine returned, and a final C3 tribute Collectors Edition featured an exclusive, opening rear window hatch.

Fourth generation (C4; 1984–1996) 

The fourth-generation Corvette was the first complete redesign of the Corvette since 1963. Production was to begin for the 1983 model year, but quality issues and part delays resulted in only 43 prototypes for the 1983 model year produced that were never sold. All of the 1983 prototypes were destroyed or serialized as 1984 model year except one with a white exterior, medium blue interior, L83 350 ci, 205 hp V8, and 4-speed automatic transmission. After extensive testing and modifications were completed, it was initially retired as a display sitting in an external wall over the Bowling Green Assembly Plant's employee entrance. Later this only surviving 1983 prototype was removed, restored, and is now on display at the National Corvette Museum in Bowling Green, Kentucky. It is still owned by GM. On February 12, 2014, it was nearly lost to a sinkhole which opened up under the museum. Eight other Corvettes were severely damaged.

Regular fourth generation production began on January 3, 1983; the 1984 model year and delivery to customers began in March 1983. The 1984 model carried over the  L83 slightly more powerful (5 hp) "Crossfire" V8 engine from the final 1982 third-generation model. New chassis features were aluminum brake calipers and an all-aluminum suspension for weight savings and rigidity. The new one-piece Targa top had no center reinforcement. Retractable headlights continued to be used, but they were now single units, which were last used in 1957. A new electronic dashboard with digital liquid crystal displays for the speedometer and tachometer was standard. Beginning in 1985, the  L98 engine with tuned port fuel injection became the standard engine.

September 1984 through 1988 Corvettes were available with a "4+3" transmission designed by Doug Nash - a 4-speed manual coupled to an automatic overdrive on the top three gears. It was devised to help the Corvette meet U.S. fuel economy standards. Since 1981 (when it was last offered), a manual transmission returned to the Corvette starting with production in late 1984. The transmission proved to be problematic and was replaced by a modern ZF 6-speed manual transmission in 1989.

In 1986, the second Corvette Indy Pace Car was released. It was the first convertible Corvette since 1975. A Center High Mounted Signal Light (CHMSL) – a third center brake light – was added in 1986 to comply with safety regulations. While the color of the pace car used in the race was yellow, all 1986 convertibles also had an Indy 500 emblem mounted on the console, making any color a "pace car edition". In 1987, the B2K twin-turbo option became available from the factory. The Callaway Corvette was a Regular Production Option (RPO B2K). The B2K option coexisted in 1990 and 1991 with the ZR-1 option, which then replaced it.

1988 saw the 35th Anniversary Edition of the Corvette. Each of these featured a special badge with an identification number mounted next to the gear selector and was finished with a white exterior, wheels, and interior. In 1990, the ZR1 option Corvette was introduced with the LT5 engine designed by Lotus and built in the Mercury Marine plant in Stillwater, Oklahoma. The LT5 engine was a 4-cam (DOHC) design producing 375 hp (280 kW) when at "open throttle". The C4 ZR1 ran from 1990 thru 1995 model years. In 1991, all Corvettes received updates to the body, interior, and wheels. The convex rear fascia that set the 1990 ZR-1 apart from the base model was now included on L98 Corvettes, making the styling of the expensive ZR-1 even closer to that of the base cars. The most obvious difference remaining between the base and ZR-1 models besides the wider rear wheels was the location of the CHMSL, which was integrated into the new rear fascia used on the base model, but remained at the top of the rear hatch on the ZR-1's.

This engine featured reverse-flow cooling (the heads were cooled before the block), which allowed for a higher compression ratio of 10.5:1. A new distributor was also debuted. Called "Optispark", the distributor was driven directly off the front of the camshaft and mounted in front of the timing cover, just above the crankshaft and harmonic balancer. Also new for 1992 was Acceleration Slip Regulation (ASR), a form of traction control that utilized the Corvette's brakes, spark retard, and throttle close-down to prevent excessive rear wheel spin and possible loss of control. The traction control device could be switched off if desired.

A special 40th Anniversary Edition was released in 1993, which featured a commemorative Ruby Red color, 40th anniversary badges, and embroidered seat backs. The 1993 Corvette also marked the introduction of the Passive Keyless Entry System, making it the first GM car to feature it. Production of the ZR-1 ended in 1995 after 6,939 cars had been built. 1996 was the final year of C4 production, and featured special models and options, including the Grand Sport and Collector Edition, OBD II (On-Board Diagnostics), run-flat tires, and the LT4 engine. The  LT4 V8 was available only with a manual transmission, while all  LT1 Corvettes used automatic transmissions.

Chevrolet released the Grand Sport (GS) version in 1996 to mark the end of production of the C4 Corvette. The Grand Sport moniker was a nod to the original Grand Sport model produced in 1963. A total of 1,000 GS Corvettes were produced, 810 as coupes and 190 as convertibles. The Grand Sport came only in Admiral Blue with a white stripe down the middle, black wheels, and two red stripes on the front left wheel arch.

Fifth generation (C5; 1997–2004) 

The C5 Corvette was redesigned from the ground up after sales from the previous generation began to decline. Production of the C5 Corvette began in 1996 but quality/manufacturing issues saw its release to the public in mass delayed until 1997, and continuing through the 2004 model year. The C5 was a completely new design that featured many new concepts and manufacturing breakthroughs that would be carried forward to the C6 & C7. Innovations included a 0.29 drag coefficient, near 50/50 weight distribution, and active handling (the first stability control for a Corvette). It also weighed less than the C4. It was the first time the platform was badge engineered as the Cadillac XLR with limited sales.

An all-new LS1 aluminum engine (Gen III small block) featured individual ignition coils for each cylinder, and aluminum block and pistons. The new engine, combined with the new body, was able to achieve up to 28 mpg on the highway.

For its first year, the C5 was available only as a coupe, although the new platform was designed from the ground up to be a convertible, which returned in 1998, followed by the fixed-roof coupe (FRC) in 1999. One concept for the FRC was for it to be a stripped-down model with a possible V6 engine (nicknamed in-house as the "Billy Bob"). By 2000, FRC plans laid the groundwork for the return in 2001 of the Z06, an RPO option not seen since Zora's 1963 race-ready Corvette.

The Z06 model replaced the FRC model as the highest-performance C5 Corvette. Instead of a heavier double-overhead cam engine like the ZR-1 of the C4 generation, the Z06 used an LS6, a  derivative of the standard LS1 engine. Using the much more rigid fixed roof design allowed the Z06 unprecedented handling thanks to upgraded brakes and less body flex. Those characteristics, along with the use of materials such as a titanium exhaust system and a carbon fiber hood in the 2004 model year, led to further weight savings and performance gains for the C5 Z06. Although the Z06's rated power output is equal to that of the C4 ZR-1, the improved rigidity, suspension, brakes, and reduced weight of the C5 produced a car quicker than C4 ZR-1.

Sixth generation (C6; 2005–2013) 

For the C6 Corvette GM wanted to focus more on refining the C5 than trying to redesign it. Car & Driver, and Motor Trend, described the C6 as an "evolution of the C5, instead of a complete redo". The C6 wheelbase was increased while body overhangs were decreased when compared to the C5. Retractable headlights were replaced with fixed units, making this the first model since 1962 to be so equipped. The C6 brought a new and improved interior compared to the C5. As a result of the upgraded interior, the C6 had a slight increase in passenger hip room. It also sported an updated LS1/LS6 engine now called the LS2. This engine was primarily an LS1/LS6 with a bump in displacement from 5.7L to 6.0 liters. The increased displacement of the 6.0 bumped the LS2's horsepower up by 50 HP over its LS1 progenitor, although still 5 HP less than the upgraded LS6 engine found in the previous C5 Z06.

The C6 generation did not match the previous generation's relatively good fuel economy, despite its relatively low 0.28 drag coefficient and low curb weight, achieving 16/26 mpg (city/highway) equipped with automatic or manual transmissions; like all manual transmission Corvettes since 1989, it is fitted with Computer Aided Gear Selection (CAGS) to improve fuel economy by requiring drivers to shift from 1st gear directly to 4th in low-speed/low-throttle conditions. This feature helps the C6 avoid the Gas Guzzler Tax by achieving better fuel economy.

The new Z06 arrived as a 2006 model in the third quarter of 2005. It has a 7.0 L version of the small block engine codenamed LS7. At 427.6 cubic inches, the Z06 was the largest small block ever offered by General Motors. Because of the Corvette's former use of 427 cubic-inch big blocks in the late-1960s and early 1970s, the LS7's size was rounded down to 427 cubic inches. Another first for a Corvette, the Z06 featured a full aluminum chassis. The frame mirrored the C5/6 architecture, but substituted aluminum hydroformed rails and aluminum extrusions and castings fore and aft. This dropped weight from 419 to 287 pounds while improving chassis stiffness.

The 6-speed manual transmission also has improved shift linkage and a 0– time of 4.0 seconds, while the automatic is set up for quicker shifts giving the C6 automatic a 0– time of 4.0 seconds, quicker than any other production automatic Corvette. The interior was slightly updated and a new 4LT leather-wrap interior package was added. The wheels were also updated to a new five-spoke design.

The LS9 engine was the most powerful to be put into a GM production sports car.

The historical name Grand Sport returned to the Corvette lineup in 2010 as an entirely new model series that replaced the Z51 option. The new model was an LS3 equipped Z06 with a steel frame instead of aluminum. It retained many of the features of the Z06 including a wide body with 18x9.5 and 19x12 inch wheels, dry-sump oiling (manual transmission coupes only), 6-piston 14-inch front brakes and 4-piston rear, and improved suspension. Manual transmission-equipped G/S coupe models received a tweaked LS3 with a forged crank, are built in Z06 fashion by hand, and utilize a dry-sump oil system. The first three gears were also made shorter for better throttle response and faster acceleration. A new launch control system was introduced for all models that allow for sub-4-second 0–60. EPA is estimated at 26 MPG highway, 1.0 G on skid pad.

Beginning with the 2011 model year, buyers of the Corvette Z06 and ZR1 were offered the opportunity to assist in the build of their engines. Titled the "Corvette Engine Build Experience," buyers paid extra to be flown to the Wixom, Michigan Performance Build Center. Participants helped the assembly line workers build the V8 engine, then took delivery of the car at the National Corvette Museum in Bowling Green, KY, near the Corvette final assembly point.

The last C6 Corvette was manufactured in February 2013. In May 2013, a federal investigation of problems with more than 100,000 C6 lighting systems was announced.

Seventh generation (C7; 2014–2019) 

Development for the seventh generation Corvette started in 2007. Originally set to be introduced for the 2011 model year, its introduction was delayed for three years. It was finally released for the 2014 model year. Mid-engine and rear-engine layouts had been considered, but the front-engine, rear-wheel drive (RWD) platform was chosen to keep production costs lower.

To GM's product planners and marketers, the fact that the Corvette had become known as an "old man's toy" became a prime factor in developing the next generation. Studies showed that about 46 percent of Corvette buyers in 2012, through October, were 55 or older, compared with 22 percent of Audi R8 and 30 percent of Porsche 911 customers. The head of Chevy marketing, Chris Perry, acknowledges that too many people saw it as the car of "the successful plumber." John Fitzpatrick, Corvette's marketing manager said "It's the old saying, 'Nobody wants to be seen driving an old man's car, but everybody wants to be seen driving a young man's car.' " To counter that perception GM planned to make the new generation C7 more aspirational to younger people. Towards that end, a camouflaged version of the car was made available in the popular video game Gran Turismo 5 in November 2012. As part of the marketing effort associated with the introduction of the new generation, the 2013 Indianapolis 500 utilized a Corvette for the 12th time as its pace car.

The Motley Fool reports that Chevrolet could be earning $10,000 or more in gross profit for every Corvette it sells. GM's profit on sales is separate from the profits made by the individual dealerships selling the cars to the public.

The LT1 engine (the "LT1" designation was first used by GM in 1970 and then later in 1992.) is in the Gen V family of small block engines, which will be used in GM vehicles as the new small V8 option. It features three advanced technologies to the new LT1 V8 engine: direct injection, variable valve timing, and an active fuel management system. Fuel injectors are located under the intake manifold. The Corvette remains rear-wheel drive with the transaxle located in the rear. Transmission choices include a 7-speed manual or a 6-speed (2014) / 8-speed (2015-) automatic with paddle shifters. The new interior includes wide-bottom seats as standard, with sportier versions with high side bolsters optional. The Corvette's flag logo has been revised for the new car and a small casting of a stingray has been added to the car's ornamentation.

Features of the new generation's structure include a carbon fiber hood and removable roof panel. The fenders, doors, and rear quarter panels remain composite. At the rear of the car, the trademark round taillights have changed to a more squarish form. The underbody panels are made of "carbon-nano" composite and it makes use of a new aluminum frame that locates the four wheels an inch farther apart, front to rear and side to side. Luggage space decreased by 33% from the previous generation's. The overall weight of the car was not announced by General Motors for many months after its first showing in January 2013. Despite the increased use of aluminum and other light weight materials, numerous publications reported that the weight would remain essentially unchanged from that of the previous generation's. In August 2013, the weight of the new Corvette was reported to be , meaning it would weigh more than the previous generation's C6 ZR1 model. The ZR1 C6 weight included a supercharger and intercooler on its 6.2L engine.

Chevrolet announced the C7 Z06 at the 2014 Detroit Auto Show. The 2015 Z06 Corvette has 650 hp from the supercharged LT4 aluminum 6.2 L V8 engine.

The new generation Corvette resurrected the "Stingray" name. Originally spelled "Sting Ray" on 1963 through 1967 models and "Stingray" from 1969 until 1976.

For the 2015 model, Chevrolet began offering a transaxle version of the 8L90 8-speed automatic to replace the previous 6-speed 6L80.

For the 2017 model year Chevrolet once again introduced the Grand Sport (GS) model. This model includes Z06 wide-body styling features and suspension tuning along with the Z51 dry sump LT1 engine configuration. Grand Sport models were available in 10 exterior colors and could have the optional Heritage Package which included hash-mark fender graphics (available in six colors. As part of the introduction of the Grand Sport in Geneva, Switzerland, Chevrolet also announced a 2017 Chevrolet Corvette Grand Sport Collector Edition that was to be limited to 1,000 vehicles in total with 850 for the US Market. Final production numbers show 784 Coupes and 151 Convertibles were built; 935 total.

The $4,995 Z25 Option Package was a cosmetic upgrade that contained the following: blue fender hash-marks, two-tone blue leather seating surfaces with a logo on the seat headrest, blue leather stitching, serialized edition numbered dash plaque, and carpeted floor mats with logo,

For the 2019 model year, the ZR1 variant returned. This model features a new LT5 engine. The long block of the LT5 is the same as the LT4, but the supercharger displacement was increased from 1.7 liters to 2.65 liters. The C7 ZR1 power output is 755 horsepower.

The last C7 Corvette (also making it the last front-engined Corvette), a black Z06, was auctioned off on June 28, 2019, for $2.7 million at the Barrett-Jackson Northeast auction. The auction benefited the Stephen Siller Tunnel to Towers Foundation, which helps pay off mortgages for the families of first responders that were killed in the line of duty and builds "mortgage-free, accessible smart homes" for injured service members.

Eighth generation (C8; 2020–present) 

The 2020 Corvette model, both coupe and convertible configurations of the base-model Stingray made their debut within a three-month gap. The coupe made its debut on July 18, 2019, with three launch colors, red (with the Z51 Package), white, and blue, while the convertible made its debut on October 2 at the Kennedy Space Center, along with the C8.R race car, which took part at the 2020 Daytona 24 Hours.

The Corvette C8 was the first production Corvette to have a rear mid-engine configuration. It was also GM's first rear mid-engine production car since the 1984 Pontiac Fiero. The C8 was the first Corvette to be offered without a traditional manual transmission, while the convertible was the first Corvette with a retractable hardtop.

In January 2020 the car became the most expensive charity vehicle that week at the Barrett-Jackson auction, selling for $3 million. The proceeds of the sale went to the Detroit Children's Fund.

The LT2 saw fuel management system upgrades for the 2022 model year which featured a new fuel pump and injectors. The base price was also increased by $1200. A new IMSA GTLM Championship Edition package, limited to 1000 units, was introduced for 2022.

The Corvette C8 Z06 is expected to debut in the 2023 model year. This engine, the LT6, is the most powerful naturally aspirated production V8 engine. The Z06 is redlined at 8600 RPM and feature the same dual-clutch transmission as the Stingray, albeit with gearing changes specific to the performance of this model.

The Corvette C8 E-Ray was unveiled on January 17, 2023, as an expected 2024 model year. It will be the first Corvette to include electric components. The Hybrid powertrain features a combined  generated from a 6.2L LT2 V8, coupled with an e-motor powering the front wheels.

Awards 
Over the years, the Corvette has won awards from automobile publications as well as organizations such as the Society of Automotive Engineers.
 Automobile Magazine ranked the 1963–1967 Sting Ray first on their "100 Coolest Cars" list, above the Dodge Viper GTS, the Porsche 911, and others. In 2013, Automobile Magazine selected the Corvette C7 as its "Automobile of the Year".
 Sports Car International placed the Corvette at number 5 on their list of the "Top Sports Cars of the 1960s".
 Hot Rod magazine in its March 1986 issue selected the 1973–74 Corvette LS6 454 as one of the "10 most collectable muscle cars" in the company of 1968–70 Chevelle, 1970 'Cuda, 1970 Challenger, 1966–67 Fairlane, 1968–70 AMX, 1970 Camaro Z28, 1968–70 GTO, 1968–69 Charger, and 1967–68 Mustang.
 Car and Driver readers selected the Corvette "Best all around car" nine out of eleven years in Car and Driver's Reader's Choice Polls including 1971, 1972, 1973, 1974, and 1975.
 Car and Driver magazine selected the Corvette for its annual Ten Best list sixteen times: the C4 from 1985 through 1989, the C5 in 1998, 1999, and 2002 through 2004, the C6 from 2005 through 2009, and the C7 in 2014.
 Motor Trend magazine named the Corvette Car of the Year in 1984, 1998, and 2020.
 Society of Automotive Engineers publication Automotive Engineering International selected the 1999 Corvette Convertible, (along with the Mercedes-Benz S500) "Best Engineered Car of the 20th century".
 The 2005 Corvette was nominated for the North American Car of the Year award and was named "Most Coveted Vehicle" in the 2006 Canadian Car of the Year contest.
 U.S. News & World Report selected the 2010 Corvette the "Best Luxury Sports Car for the Money".
 Edmunds.com, in its "100 Best Cars Of All Time" list, ranked the 1963 Corvette Stingray as the 16th best car ever produced worldwide. The 1990 ZR1 took #50, the 1955 Corvette V8 took #72, and the 2009 ZR1 took #78 overall.
 The 2014 Corvette was nominated for the North American Car of the Year award.
 Motor Trend awarded the C8 Z06 the 2023 Performance Vehicle of the Year award.

NASA Corvettes 

Astronaut Alan Shepard, a long-time Corvette owner, was invited by then GM Chief Engineer Zora Arkus-Duntov to drive pre-production Corvette models. General Motors executives later gave Shepard a 1972 model with a Bill Mitchell interior. Jim Rathmann, a Melbourne, Florida Chevrolet dealer and winner of the 1960 Indy 500, befriended astronauts Shepard, Gus Grissom, and Gordon Cooper. Rathmann convinced GM President Ed Cole to set up a program that supplied each astronaut with a pair of new cars each year. Most chose a family car for their wives and a Corvette for themselves. In his memoir Last Man On The Moon, Gene Cernan describes how this worked. The astronauts received brand-new Corvettes, which they were given the option to purchase at a "used" price after they'd been driven 3000 miles. Alan Bean recalls Corvettes lined up in the parking lot outside the astronaut offices at the Johnson Space Center in Houston, and friendly races between Shepard and Grissom along the Florida beach roads and on beaches as local police turned a blind eye. Shepard, Grissom and Cooper even pulled each other on skis in the shallow water. The Mercury and later astronauts were unofficially tied to the Corvette and appeared in official photographs with their cars and with mock-ups of space vehicles such as the Apollo Lunar Module or Lunar Roving Vehicle. Cooper talked of the races along Cocoa Beach in his eulogy of Shepard at the Johnson Space Center in 1998.

Concept cars 
Corvette concept cars have inspired the designs of several generations of Corvettes. The first Corvette, Harley Earl's 1953 EX-122 Corvette prototype was itself, a concept show car, first shown to the public at the 1953 GM Motorama at the Waldorf-Astoria Hotel in New York City on January 17, 1953. It was brought to production in six months with only minor changes.

Harley Earl's successor, Bill Mitchell was the man behind most of the Corvette concepts of the 1960s and 1970s. The second-generation (C2) of 1963 was his, and its design first appeared on the Stingray Racer of 1959. It made its public debut at Maryland's Marlborough Raceway on April 18, 1959, powered by a  V8 with experimental 11:1 compression aluminum cylinder heads and took fourth place. The concept car was raced through 1960 having only "Sting Ray" badges before it was put on the auto-show circuit in 1961.

In 1961 the XP-755 Mako Shark show car was designed by Larry Shinoda as a concept for future Corvettes. In keeping with the name, the streamlining, pointed snout, and other detailing was partly inspired by the look of that very fast fish. The 1961 Corvette tail was given two additional tail lights (six total) for the concept car. The body inspired the 1963 production Sting Ray.

In 1965 Mitchell removed the original concept body and redesigned it as the Mako Shark II. Chevrolet actually created two of them, only one of which was fully functional. The original Mako Shark was then retroactively called the Mako Shark I. The Mako Shark II debuted in 1965 as a show car and this concept influenced Mitchell's redesigned Corvette of 1968.

The Aerovette has a mid-engine configuration using a transverse mounting of its V8 engine. Zora Arkus-Duntov's engineers originally built two XP-882s during 1969. John DeLorean, Chevy general manager, ordered one for display at the 1970 New York Auto Show. In 1972, DeLorean authorized further work on the XP-882. A near-identical body in aluminum alloy was constructed and became the XP-895 "Reynolds Aluminum Car." Duntov and Mitchell responded with two Chevrolet Vega (stillborn) Wankel 2-rotor engines joined together as a 4-rotor  engine which was used to power the XP-895. It was first shown in late 1973. The 4-rotor show car was outfitted with a  small-block V8 in 1977 and rechristened Aerovette. GM chairman Thomas Murphy approved the Aerovette for 1980 production, but Mitchell's retirement that year, combined with then Corvette chief engineer Dave McLellan's lack of enthusiasm for the mid-engine design and slow-selling data on mid-engined cars killed the last hope for a mid-engine Corvette.

A Corvette Stingray Anniversary concept car was unveiled at the 2009 Detroit Auto Show, fifty years after the Sting Ray racer-concept of 1959. The vehicle was based on a combination of the 1963 Sting Ray and the 1968 Stingray. The new Stingray concept appears in the 2009 movie Transformers: Revenge of the Fallen, as the vehicle mode of the character Sideswipe. A convertible/speedster version was used for the same character in the 2011 sequel, Transformers: Dark of the Moon.

Production 
Production statistics from when the first-generation of Corvettes was released in 1953 until the present.

Owner demographics 
According to research by Specialty Equipment Market Association and Experian Automotive, as of 2009, there were approximately 750,000 Corvettes of all model years registered in the United States. Corvette owners were fairly equally distributed throughout the country, with the highest density in Michigan (3.47 per 1000 residents) and the lowest density in Utah, Mississippi, and Hawaii (1.66, 1.63, and 1.53 registrations per 1000 residents). 47% of them hold college degrees (significantly above the nationwide average of 27%), and 82% are between the ages of 40 and 69 (median age being 53).

Racing

C5-R 

In 1960, three C-1 Corvettes were race modified and entered in the 24 Hours of Le Mans by team owner Briggs Cunningham and were numbered #1, #2, and #3 cars in the race. The numbered #3 car was driven by John Fitch and Bob Grossman and it had finished the race in eighth place overall, but it had won the big-bore GT class.

The Chevrolet Corvette C5-R is a grand touring racing car built by Pratt & Miller and General Motors for competition in endurance racing. The car is based on the C5 generation of the Chevrolet Corvette sports car, yet is designed purely for motorsports use. It became one of the most dominant cars in GT categories, with wins at the 24 Hours of Daytona, 12 Hours of Sebring, and 24 Hours of Le Mans, as well as championships in the American Le Mans Series. The Corvette C5-Rs debuted in 1999 and continues to be raced to this day, although the C5-R has effectively been replaced by the Corvette C6.R.

C6.R 

C6.R GT1 (Z06)
In 2005, the factory Corvette Team began racing the C6.R to coincide with the new sixth-generation (C6) Corvette being released to the public. Private teams, primarily in Europe, continued to race the C5-R for a couple of years before switching to the C6.R. Corvette C6.R went on to win its class at every race it entered in the 2005 ALMS season. By the end of 2009, Corvette had clinched four consecutive ALMS GT1 team and manufacturers titles (2005–2008) and three Le Mans 24 Hour class victories in the LMGT1 category (2005, 2006, 2009). 2007 and 2008 races were won by the factory Aston Martin squad's DBR9. The last official race for factory GT1 Corvettes was the 2009 24 Hours of Le Mans.

C6.R GT2 (ZR1)
While some privateers continued to use the GT1 version of the C6.R in Europe, the official factory team Corvette Racing switched from the slowly dying GT1 category to the much more competitive and popular GT2 class in mid-2009. The new GT2 C6.R used a modified version of the ZR1 model body but does not have the ZR1 supercharged engine. GT2 rules are based more on production vehicles, therefore the GT2 C6.R naturally aspirated engine was considerably more restricted and less powerful than its predecessor. The car debuted at Mid-Ohio's ALMS round. They achieved one ALMS race victory in the remaining 2009 ALMS season, and one victory at the final round of the 2010 ALMS season, Petit Le Mans. Corvette Racing's two GT2 C6.Rs also led most of the 2010 24 Hours of Le Mans, but both cars were forced to retire. Racing in the new GTE Pro class, the C6.R raced in the 2011 24 Hours of Le Mans with the No. 73 car taking the class victory. The No. 74 car led the class for most of the race but crashed in the morning hours. The C6.R raced by Larbre Competition also took the GTE Am class victory. In 2012, Corvette Racing returned to glory in the ALMS winning 4 of 10 races and claiming the Driver's, Team, and Manufacturer's Championships. Corvette Racing repeated the feat in 2013 by winning 5 of 10 races and claiming the Driver's, Team, and Manufacturer's Championships again.

C7.R 

IN 2014, Corvette Racing introduced the new C7.R to coincide with the launch of the seventh-generation C7 Corvette. The car made its track debut at the 2013 Rolex Motorsports Reunion and later participated in the 2014 Roar Before the Rolex 24 to prepare for the 2014 United SportsCar Championship. The car's new livery debuted at the 2014 North American International Auto Show. In 2015, the Corvette Racing C7.R took class victories at both the 24 Hours of Daytona and the 24 Hours of Le Mans.

C8.R 

In October 2019, at the Kennedy Space Center Visitor Complex, the C8.R made its surprise debut during the world premiere of the C8 Convertible. Two cars took part in the 2020 Rolex 24 at Daytona International Speedway. The cars placed 4th and 7th in the GTLM Class. For the 2022 model year, Chevrolet offered a C8.R inspired IMSA GTLM Special Edition package for the production Corvette Stingray.

Indianapolis 500 pace cars 

The Indianapolis 500 race has used a Corvette as its pace car 18 times. The 2008 running of the Indy 500 represented a record fifth-consecutive year to lead the field until 2009 when the Chevrolet Camaro SS was selected. The Corvette's pace car years and details include:
 1978 – Driven by 1960 race winner Jim Rathmann; Chevrolet produced 6,502 production replicas.
 1986 – Driven by famed pilot Chuck Yeager; all 7,315 production convertibles were considered pace car convertibles and included official graphics (to be installed at the owner's discretion).
 1995 – Driven by then-Chevrolet General Manager Jim Perkins; 527 production replicas were produced.
 1998 – Driven by 1963 race winner Parnelli Jones after an injury prevented golfer Greg Norman from performing the duty; 1,158 replicas were produced.
 2002 – Driven by actor Jim Caviezel; no replicas were produced, but graphics were available by special order. About 300 sets sold.
 2004 – Driven by actor Morgan Freeman; no production replicas produced.
 2005 – Driven by General Colin Powell; no production replicas produced.
 2006 – Driven by cycling champion Lance Armstrong; first Corvette Z06 pace car; no production replicas produced.
 2007 – Driven by actor Patrick Dempsey; 500 production replicas – all convertibles.
 2008 – Driven by Emerson Fittipaldi; 500 production replicas – coupes and convertibles.
 2012 – Driven by Guy Fieri; first Corvette C6 ZR1 pace car; no production replicas produced.
 2013 – Driven by Jim Harbaugh; first year of production for the C7 generation.
 2015 – Driven by Jeff Gordon; first Chevrolet Corvette C7 Z06 pace car
 2017 – Driven by actor Jeffrey Dean Morgan; 2017 Grand Sport Convertible
 2018 - Driven by professional basketball player Victor Oladipo. Chevrolet Corvette C7 ZR1; no production replicas produced.
 2019 - Driven by NBC Sports broadcaster Dale Earnhardt Jr. Last year of production for C7 generation; no production replicas produced.
 2020 - Driven by GM President Mark Reuss. 2020 Corvette Stingray Torch Red Coupe. No replicas were produced.

See also 
 Chevrolet Engineering Research Vehicle
 Kaiser Darrin, prototype in 1952, 435 built for the 1954 model year
 Nash-Healey, 1951–1954
 National Corvette Museum
 VH1 Corvette Give-away Sweepstakes (also known as the "VH1 Collection", 36 Corvettes, one for each model year, 1953-1989)
 CorvetteForum, the largest Corvette enthusiasts' club in the world

Notes

References 

 Nichols, Richard. Corvette: 1953 to the Present. London: Bison Books, 1985. .

Further media 
 Videos

External links 

 
 Chevrolet Corvette (North American site)
 Chevrolet Corvette (European site)

 
1950s cars
1960s cars
1970s cars
1980s cars
1990s cars
2000s cars
2010s cars
2020s cars
Bowling Green, Kentucky
Corvette
Coupés
Motor vehicles manufactured in the United States
Rear-wheel-drive vehicles
Roadsters
Hatchbacks
Cars introduced in 1953
Flagship vehicles
Front mid-engine, rear-wheel-drive vehicles
Rear mid-engine, rear-wheel-drive vehicles